Performing Lines is an Australian performing arts producer and presenter.

It was established in 1990 as a successor to the Australian Content department of the Australian Elizabethan Theatre Trust, with Wendy Blacklock as general manager.

Performing Lines presents national and international tours of innovative Australian performing arts.

References

External links
Official website

Theatre in Australia
1990 establishments in Australia